"My Eyes" is a song recorded by American country music artist Blake Shelton featuring Gwen Sebastian. It was released in April 2014 as the fifth single from his seventh studio album, Based on a True Story.... The song was written by Andrew Dorff, Tommy Lee James and Josh Osborne.

Critical reception
Billy Dukes of Taste of Country gave the song a positive review, saying that "‘My Eyes’ is a sexy love song that heats the sheets to a melting point hotter than his previous two lovers."

Commercial performance
"My Eyes" debuted at number 39 on the U.S. Billboard Country Airplay chart for the week of April 26, 2014. The song peaked at Number One on the Country Airplay Charts, making it Shelton's 12th consecutive number one single. It has sold 550,000 copies in the United States as of August 2014. The song was certified Gold by the RIAA on September 23, 2014.

Charts

Year-end charts

Certifications

References

2013 singles
2013 songs
Country ballads
2010s ballads
Blake Shelton songs
Gwen Sebastian songs
Warner Records Nashville singles
Songs written by Tommy Lee James
Songs written by Josh Osborne
Songs written by Andrew Dorff
Song recordings produced by Scott Hendricks
Male–female vocal duets